The Washington Manuscript of the Psalms (Washington MS II), designated as Rahlfs 1219 (in the Rahlfs numbering of Septuagint manuscripts), or van Haelst 83 (in the Van Haelst catalogue numbers of Septuagint manuscripts), is a Septuagint manuscript containing the text of Psalm 1:4-146:9a, 149:2b-151:6 in Greek, plus the first 6 verses of the book of Odes, written on parchment. Using the study of comparative writing styles (palaeography), is has been dated to have been written sometime in the 5th Century CE.

Description
The manuscript is a codex (precursor to the modern book) made of 107 parchment leaves, badly decayed and worm eaten. In his initial description of the manuscript, biblical scholar Henry A. Sanders noted that sometime in the 10th Century CE, some of the final pages of the codex that contained Psalms 142:9-151 were lost. Rather than having new pages written, other pages from a slightly less older codex were taken and added to the end, completing the Psalms and adding six verses from the book of Odes (1:1-6a). This is apparent due to the different page size, the repetition of Psalm 142:5-8, and the divergent handwriting. Sanders indicated the original codex by the Greek letter Λ (Lambda), and the secondary codex as Λ (Lambda A).

 Λ:
The parchment is a mixture of goat and sheep skin. The main text is written in a dark-brown ink, with red ink used for the Psalm titles and numbers, and also for the word διαψαλμα (diapsalma / musical interlude). The text is written in one column per page, which originally would've been around 25 x 35 cm, 30 lines per page, with about 25-30 letters per line.
Due to decay, almost half of each leaf is missing, with some leaves having decay covering them in their entirety, although with letters still visible.
The text is written in large square uncial, with the Psalm titles usually in a slightly smaller size.
Each Psalm has its number in the left hand margin in uppercase letters representing numerals, with decorative lines above and below the letter.
The manuscript covers Psalms 1:4-142:8, with the last pages of the manuscript completely missing.

 Λ:
The parchment is made of sheepskin only. The main text is written in a medium-brown ink, with red ink used for the Psalm titles and numbers as in Λ. The text is written in one column per page, which originally would've been around 27.5 x 21.58 cm, 24 lines per page, with about 18-24 letters per line.
The seven leaves are in a fragmentary condition, and would originally have contained Psalms 142:5-151:6 and Odes 1:1-6a, but due to the loss of two leaves, Psalms 146:9b-149:2b are missing.
The text is written in large, sloping letters known as Slavonic uncial.

Text of Codex
 Λ:
 - Has very little punctuation, with most occurring only at the end of lines, with Sanders only counting 8 exceptions.

 - Text is written in verses corresponding to the Hebrew parallelisms, with any that go over one line being written on the line below, usually with an indent to signify that it's not a new phrase.

 - Has no stanza division, but the writing does align somewhat with the stichoi of Codex Vaticanus.

 - Has certain ligatures (representing και, ου, μου, αυτου, ον, μαι, του, μνης, νην, θαι, ται) for the ends of lines where the text becomes crowded, although sometimes these ligatures are used within the lines themselves.

 - Uses diacritical strokes and dots over vowels (though not consistently), varying from a short grave accent to a small dot.

 - Uses the apostrophe consistently throughout, with a slightly varied shape. This appears mainly after final consonants, between double consonants, between unlike consonants, and after the Greek εκ.

 Λ:
 - Has only 11 extant cases of punctuation.
 - Text aligns with the stichoi of Codex Vaticanus, with any verses going over one line being spread onto two or more lines, with indentation to signify inclusion with what precedes.
 - Has certain ligatures (representing μους, ται, αυτου, του) infrequently.
In contrast to Λ, υιος (son) is not a nomen sacrum, and μητηρ (mother) doesn't occur.

History of Manuscript
Prior to its purchase by industrialist Charles Lang Freer in 1906 from an Arab dealer named Ali in Gizah, Cairo, very little is known about the manuscript, where it came from or for whom it was written. One possible place of origin is the Church of Timothy in the Monastery of the Vinedresser, a Coptic Monastery probably destroyed during the Muslim persecutions of the 14th Century CE.

When the manuscript was granted to Sanders, he had to go through a long and precarious process of separating the leaves of the codex, which due to decay had turned the parchment into a hard, glue-like substance, becoming a solid mass. Sanders describes in detail in The Old Testament Manuscripts in the Freer Collection, Part II: The Washington Manuscript of the Psalms, pp 107–109 how he separated the leaves of the codex, which effectively employed the use of a woollen cloth, and a thin-bladed dinner knife.

Due to the fragmentary and fragile nature of the manuscript, Sanders was unable to separate more than two leaves in a day, having to create as accurate a collation as possible before further deterioration occurred on the leaves, and as such his reprint of the text shows letters that are now no longer extant.

The manuscript is one of the six main manuscripts that comprise the Freer Biblical Manuscripts, currently housed at The Freer Gallery of Art.

References

External links
 George R. Swain, Photographs of the Washington Manuscript of the Psalms in the Freer Collection at Internet Archive

Biblical manuscripts
5th-century biblical manuscripts
Septuagint manuscripts
Manuscripts in the collection of the Smithsonian Institution
Collection of the Smithsonian Institution